Built in 1915, the Heber Second Ward Meetinghouse, originally built as a place of worship for the Church of Jesus Christ of Latter-day Saints is of historical significance to the city, and was added to the National Register of Historic Places on December 12, 1978.  Bishop Joseph A Rasband served as the Heber Second Ward's first bishop in the meetinghouse, and his first counselor James Heber Moulton was the superintendent that oversaw the building of the meetinghouse.  Joseph Nelson was the architect. Construction of the building was begun 16 Mar 1914; it was dedicated by Francis Lyman on December 26, 1915 and served the Second Ward into the 1960s when it was sold. The building is now the St. Lawrence Catholic Church.

References

20th-century Latter Day Saint church buildings
Buildings and structures in Heber City, Utah
Former Latter Day Saint religious buildings and structures
Gothic Revival church buildings in Utah
Meetinghouses of the Church of Jesus Christ of Latter-day Saints in Utah
Churches on the National Register of Historic Places in Utah
Churches completed in 1915
National Register of Historic Places in Wasatch County, Utah
1915 establishments in Utah